Superstar K3 is the third season of the South Korean television talent show series Superstar K, broadcast by M.net. The theme song for this season, "Fly" is written by producer Park Keun-tae and sung by Super Junior-K.R.Y. It was released on 14 April 2011 and debuted at the preliminary round in Busan on 24 April till the final show in November. It was also the first season within the show's three-year history to allow group acts to compete.

Broadcasting time

Broadcast

TOP 11 

 Originally to consist of the TOP 10 finalist, however, the team "Yery Band" were subsequently removed from the show and were replaced by the contestants "Haze" and "Busker Busker." This meant that the final line-up became the TOP 11.

Note
 The order is based on the order in which the above contestants performed.
 Super-Save Scheme: The contestant who scores the highest score from the judges will be exempted from being eliminated regardless of the poll results.
  Winner
  Super-Save
  Dropout

References

External links
 Superstar K3 

2011 South Korean television seasons